Daphrose Nyiramutuzo (born 1 September 1972) is a Rwandan middle-distance runner. She competed in the women's 1500 metres at the 1988 Summer Olympics.

References

1972 births
Living people
Athletes (track and field) at the 1988 Summer Olympics
Rwandan female middle-distance runners
Olympic athletes of Rwanda
Place of birth missing (living people)